The William M. Jennings Trophy is an annual National Hockey League (NHL) award given to "the goaltender(s) having played a minimum of 25 games for the team with the fewest goals scored against it ... based on regular-season play." From 1946 until 1981, the Vezina Trophy had been awarded under that definition, but it was later changed and replaced by the Jennings Trophy. It is named in honor of William M. Jennings, the longtime governor and president of the New York Rangers. Since its beginnings in 1982, it has been awarded at the end of 40 seasons to 44 different players; mostly in tandems of two goaltenders.

The most recent winners are Frederik Andersen and Antti Raanta of the Carolina Hurricanes, which had a league-low 202 team goals-against in the 2021–22 NHL season.

History
From 1946 until the 1980–81 season, the Vezina Trophy was awarded to the goaltender(s) of the NHL team allowing the fewest goals during the regular season. However, it was recognized that this system often meant the trophy went to the goaltender of the better team rather than the individual and was changed to offer the trophy to the most outstanding goaltender, as voted by the NHL general managers. The William M. Jennings Trophy was created as a replacement and is awarded to the starting goaltender(s) playing for the team with the fewest goals against.

The Jennings Trophy was donated by the NHL's board of governors and first presented at the conclusion of the 1981–82 season. It is named in honor of the late William M. Jennings, who was a longtime governor and president of the New York Rangers and a builder of ice hockey in the United States. Normally the minimum number of games a goaltender must play to be eligible for the trophy is 25, but for the lockout shortened 1994–95 season, the required minimum was fourteen games.

Eight players have won both the Jennings and Vezina Trophy for the same season: Patrick Roy ( and ), Ed Belfour ( and ), Dominik Hasek ( and ), Martin Brodeur, Miikka Kiprusoff, Tim Thomas, Carey Price, and Marc-André Fleury. Roy and Brodeur have won the trophy five times each, the most of any goaltenders. Belfour is third, having won four times. The Montreal Canadiens have the most wins, with six, followed by the New Jersey Devils and the Chicago Blackhawks with five each, and the Buffalo Sabres and Boston Bruins with three.

Winners

Bold Player with the fewest goals ever scored against in a season.

Notes

See also
List of National Hockey League awards
List of NHL statistical leaders

References

General

Specific

National Hockey League trophies and awards